Perfect Man is the fourth full-length album released by German heavy metal band Rage in 1988. This album introduces the Refuge years line-up, with the new members Manni Schmidt and Chris Efthimiadis, and the band's mascot, the "Sounchaser", which would feature in most other Rage cover arts. The album was remastered by Noise/Sanctuary in 2002 with slightly altered cover art, and five bonus tracks.

Track listing

Personnel 
 Rage
Peter "Peavy" Wagner – vocals, bass
Manni Schmidt – guitars
Chris Efthimiadis – drums

 Production
Armin Sabol – producer, arrangements
Rage – arrangements
Will Reid-Dick – engineer, mixing
Karl-Ulrich Walterbach – executive producer

References 

1988 albums
Rage (German band) albums
Noise Records albums